Timeline of knowledge about the interstellar medium and intergalactic medium

 1848 — Lord Rosse studies M1 and names it the Crab Nebula. The telescope is much larger than the small refactors typical of this period and it also reveals the spiral nature of M51.
 1864 — William Huggins studies the spectrum of the Orion Nebula and shows that it is a cloud of gas
 1904 —   Interstellar calcium detected on spectrograph at Potsdam
 1909 —   Slipher confirms Kapteyn's theory of interstellar gas
 1912 —   Slipher confirms interstellar dust
 1927 — Ira Bowen explains unidentified spectral lines from space as forbidden transition lines
 1930 — Robert Trumpler discovers absorption by interstellar dust by comparing the angular sizes and brightnesses of globular clusters
 1944 — Hendrik van de Hulst predicts the 21 cm hyperfine line of neutral interstellar hydrogen
 1951 — Harold I. Ewen and Edward Purcell observe the 21 cm hyperfine line of neutral interstellar hydrogen
 1956 — Lyman Spitzer predicts coronal gas around the Milky Way
 1965 — James Gunn and Bruce Peterson use observations of the relatively low absorption of the blue component of the Lyman-alpha line from 3C9 to strongly constrain the density and ionization state of the intergalactic medium
 1969 — Lewis Snyder, David Buhl, Ben Zuckerman, and Patrick Palmer find interstellar formaldehyde
 1970 — Arno Penzias and Robert Wilson find interstellar carbon monoxide
 1970 — George Carruthers observes molecular hydrogen in space
 1977 — Christopher McKee and Jeremiah Ostriker propose a three component theory of the interstellar medium
 1990 — Foreground "contamination" data from the COBE spacecraft provides the first all-sky map of the ISM in microwave bands.

References

Interstellar and intergalactic medium
Astrochemistry